Nitchevo is a 1926 French silent film directed by Jacques de Baroncelli and starring Charles Vanel, Lillian Hall-Davis and Marcel Vibert. de Baroncelli remade it as a sound film in 1936.

Cast
 Charles Vanel as Captain Cartier  
 Lillian Hall-Davis as Sonia  
 Marcel Vibert 
 Raphaël Lievin as D'Arbères
 Suzy Vernon as Claire  
 Jean d'Yd 
 Mireille Barsac
 Henri Rudaux as Lt. de Kergoet
 Raoul Paoli 
 Abel Sovet

References

Bibliography
 Dayna Oscherwitz & MaryEllen Higgins. The A to Z of French Cinema. Scarecrow Press, 2009.

External links

1926 films
French silent films
1920s French-language films
Films directed by Jacques de Baroncelli
Submarine films
French black-and-white films
1920s French films